The Staffordshire Wildlife Trust is a wildlife trust covering the county of Staffordshire, England.

Organisation and activities
It is one of 46 Wildlife Trusts; each is a registered charity and is a member of the Royal Society of Wildlife Trusts. The Staffordshire Wildlife Trust was founded in 1969. It has about 160 members of staff, overseen by a board of trustees. The Trust is supported by a network of volunteers.

The Trust has two visitor centres: the Wolseley Centre, near Rugeley, which is its headquarters, and at Westport Lake, Stoke-on-Trent.

The Trust manages 32 nature reserves, and carries out conservation projects. It engages with schools regarding environmental education, and works with communities to improve green spaces for wildlife. It offers advice about how to protect and enhance wildlife habitats.

The Trust publishes a magazine for members, Wild Staffordshire, three times a year.

Nature reserves
The Trust looks after these nature reserves:

 Allimore Green
 Bateswood
 Biddulph Grange Country Park
 Black Brook
 Black Firs and Cranberry Bog
 Brankley Pastures
 Brough Park Fields
 Brown End Quarry
 Castern Wood
 Cecilly Brook
 Cotton Dell
 Croxall Lakes
 Doxey Marshes
 Gentleshaw Common
 George's Hayes
 Gun Moor
 Harston Wood
 Hem Heath Woods
 Highgate Common
 Ipstones Edge
 Jackson's Coppice and Marsh
 Knotbury Common
 Ladderedge Country Park
 Loynton Moss
 Parrot's Drumble
 Pasturefields Saltmarsh
 Radford Meadows
 Rod Wood
 Side Farm Meadows
 The Roaches
 Thorswood
 Tucklesholme
 Weag's Barn
 Wetley Moor

References

External links
Staffordshire Wildlife Trust website

Organisations based in Staffordshire
Wildlife Trusts of England
1969 establishments in England
Environment of Staffordshire